"Moody Blue" is a song made famous by Elvis Presley.  The song was written by Mark James who recorded the original version of the song, which reached #15 in South Africa during the summer of 1976.  James also penned Elvis' "Suspicious Minds".

"Moody Blue" was Presley's last No. 1 hit in his lifetime, topping the Billboard magazine Hot Country Singles chart in February 1977.   "Moody Blue" also peaked at number thirty-one on the Hot 100.  RCA Records also issued an extremely limited quantity of the "Moody Blue" single in an experimental translucent blue vinyl pressing, with "She Thinks I Still Care" as the B-side. Six months after "Moody Blue" topped the chart, Presley was dead.

The song was recorded in February 1976 in the Jungle Room of Presley's Graceland home.
The only time Elvis performed the song in its entirety was on February 21, 1977, at a concert in Charlotte, North Carolina. He had attempted to perform the song February 20 at the same venue but revealed to the crowd that he had completely forgotten the song; he returned on February 21, lead sheet in hand, and performed the song with his eyes glued to the lyrics. Both the February 20 false-start and the February 21 performance were recorded on soundboard in good sound quality and were released officially in 2007 by the Follow That Dream label; still photos of the February 21 performance also exist. The complete version was first released on bootleg by the Fort Baxter label in 1995.

By May 1977 the song had reached 120,000 sales in Germany.

Chart performance

Weekly charts

Year-end charts

References

External links
 

Elvis Presley songs
1976 singles
1977 singles
Songs written by Mark James (songwriter)
Song recordings produced by Felton Jarvis
1976 songs
RCA Records singles